I'm in Pittsburgh and It's Raining is a retrospective album by the Outcasts that was released in CD format.

Release data

This album was released as a CD by Collectables Records in 1995 as #COL-CD-0591.

Musical highlights

The album contains the music on four of their five singles, plus two versions of "Smokestack Lightning" and a rehearsal session of "I'm in Pittsburgh (And It's Raining)", their best known song.  There are also six recordings that were not released on their singles; according to the liner notes, this material dates from the time of the last single, when the band had moved to Gallant Records of Houston.  However, the first single is not included, nor are both versions of "Everyday", which was used in two versions as the flip side of the last two singles.

With the exception of "1523 Blair" (which is taken from a vinyl source), the music is newly mixed from the original master tapes.

Track listing 

 I'm in Pittsburgh (And It's Raining)
 Smokestack Lightning
 Route 66
 Sweet Mary
 I'll Set You Free
 Everyday
 What Price Victory?
 My Love
 My Generation
 Smokestack Lightning single version
 1523 Blair
 Season of the Witch
 Come on Over
 The Birds
 I'm in Pittsburgh (And It's Raining) early rehearsal

1995 compilation albums
The Outcasts (Texas band) albums